Singles Collection: The London Years is a compilation album by the Rolling Stones, released in 1989. It was released as a 3-CD and a 4-LP set.

Background
Singles Collection: The London Years was released by former manager Allen Klein's ABKCO Records (who usurped control of the band's Decca/London material in 1970) after the band's departure from Decca and Klein.

The set is a triple album of every Rolling Stones single—and their B-Sides—mostly in their original mono mixes (at least as of the 2002 reissue), in both the UK and US encompassing their entire era with Decca Records in the United Kingdom and London Records in the United States—hence the album's title.

The original collection was produced by Andrew Loog Oldham, and digitally compiled and prepared under his supervision by P. D. Rain and Jody Klein.

With a range from 1963 to 1971, the set begins with their very first UK single, Chuck Berry's "Come On", and runs to Sticky Fingers''' "Brown Sugar" and "Wild Horses" (which Allen Klein shares release rights with The Rolling Stones).

The only omissions are four B-sides from 1970 and 1971. "Bitch" and "Let It Rock" (released in the UK on the "Brown Sugar" single) and "Sway" (B-side to "Wild Horses"). Allen Klein did not have release rights to this material when this compilation was released. Also not included was "Natural Magic", a Jack Nitzsche instrumental, released as the B-side to the 1970 Mick Jagger single "Memo from Turner". These are available on the box set Singles 1968–1971 except "Let It Rock" which is available on the box set Singles 1971–2006 and the Rarities 1971–2003 album.

The release also does not include the EPs released by the band, The Rolling Stones, Five by Five and Got Live If You Want It!, which are available on the box set Singles 1963–1965.

Release and receptionSingles Collection: The London Years was released at a timely juncture, just a couple of weeks before The Rolling Stones' comeback album Steel Wheels was due for release after a significant break, and months following their induction into the Rock and Roll Hall of Fame. Going platinum, the album reached No. 91 in the US.

In 2006, Steven Van Zandt placed Singles Collection: The London Years on top of his list of the most essential albums of all time, calling it:

In August 2002, Singles Collection: The London Years'' was issued in a new remastered Compact Disc and SACD digipak by ABKCO Records.

Track listing
All songs by Mick Jagger and Keith Richards, except where noted.

Disc one
"Come On" (Chuck Berry) – 1:48
"I Want to Be Loved" (Willie Dixon) – 1:52
"I Wanna Be Your Man" (John Lennon/Paul McCartney) – 1:43
"Stoned" (Nanker Phelge) – 2:09
"Not Fade Away" (Charles Hardin/Norman Petty) – 1:47
"Little by Little" (Nanker Phelge/Phil Spector) – 2:39
"It's All Over Now" (Bobby Womack/Shirley Jean Womack) – 3:27
"Good Times, Bad Times" – 2:31
"Tell Me" – 2:47
"I Just Want to Make Love to You" (Willie Dixon) – 2:17
"Time Is on My Side" (Norman Meade) – 2:59
"Congratulations" – 2:28
"Little Red Rooster" (Willie Dixon) – 3:05
"Off the Hook" – 2:34
"Heart of Stone" – 2:45
"What a Shame" – 3:03
"The Last Time" – 3:42
"Play with Fire" (Nanker Phelge) – 2:14
"(I Can't Get No) Satisfaction" – 3:43
"The Under Assistant West Coast Promotion Man" (Nanker Phelge) – 3:20
"The Spider and the Fly" – 3:38
"Get Off of My Cloud" – 2:54
"I'm Free" – 2:24
"The Singer Not the Song" – 2:22
"As Tears Go By" (Mick Jagger/Keith Richards/Andrew Loog Oldham) – 2:45

Disc two
"Gotta Get Away" – 2:07
"19th Nervous Breakdown" – 3:56
"Sad Day" – 3:01
"Paint It, Black" – 3:44
"Stupid Girl" – 2:55
"Long Long While" – 3:01
"Mother's Little Helper" – 2:45
"Lady Jane" – 3:10
"Have You Seen Your Mother, Baby, Standing in the Shadow?" – 2:34
"Who's Driving Your Plane?" – 3:14
"Let's Spend the Night Together" – 3:26
"Ruby Tuesday" – 3:13
"We Love You" – 4:36
"Dandelion" – 3:48
"She's a Rainbow" – 4:11
"2000 Light Years from Home" – 4:44
"In Another Land" (Bill Wyman) – 2:53
"The Lantern" – 4:26
"Jumpin' Jack Flash" – 3:38
"Child of the Moon" – 3:12

Disc three
"Street Fighting Man" – 3:09
"No Expectations" – 3:55
"Surprise, Surprise" – 2:30
"Honky Tonk Women" – 3:00
"You Can't Always Get What You Want"  – 4:49
"Memo from Turner" – 4:06
Released as a Mick Jagger solo single in November 1970
"Brown Sugar" – 3:49
"Wild Horses" – 5:42
"I Don't Know Why" (Stevie Wonder/Paul Riser/Don Hunter/Lula Hardaway) – 3:01
"Try a Little Harder" – 2:17
"Out of Time" – 3:22
"Jiving Sister Fanny" – 3:20
"Sympathy for the Devil" – 6:17

All tracks on disc one and most of disc two were produced by Andrew Loog Oldham; tracks 1–4 of disc one were co-produced with Eric Easton. Tracks 15–18 of disc two were produced by The Rolling Stones and tracks 19–20 produced by Jimmy Miller. All tracks on disc three were produced by Jimmy Miller, except tracks 3, 10, and 11, which were produced by Andrew Loog Oldham. and track 6, which was produced by Jack Nitzsche.

Chart positions

Certification

References

Albums produced by Andrew Loog Oldham
Albums produced by Jack Nitzsche
Albums produced by Jimmy Miller
Albums produced by Mick Jagger
The Rolling Stones compilation albums
1989 compilation albums
ABKCO Records compilation albums
Albums with cover art by Mick Rock
Albums recorded at IBC Studios
Albums recorded at Olympic Sound Studios